Sheena 667 is a 2019 Russian drama film directed by Grigoriy Dobrygin. The film premiered at the 2019 International Film Festival Rotterdam. It is scheduled to be theatrically released on April 15, 2021 by A-One Films.

Plot 
The film tells about two people named Olya and Vadim who work in a car service on the outskirts of the city of Vyshny Volochyok and they love each other. And suddenly they get access to the Internet...

Cast 
 Vladimir Svirskiy as Vadim, the owner of a car service station
 Yuliya Peresild as Olya, Vadim's wife
 Jordan Frye as Sheena667
 Nadezhda Markina	
 Yury Kuznetsov
 Pavel Vorozhtsov
 Nataliya Nozdrina

References

External links 
 

2019 films
2010s Russian-language films
Russian drama films